Cabildo Abierto (Spanish for "Open cabildo" or "Town hall meeting") is a Uruguayan right-wing political party founded in 2019. It participated for the first time in an election the same year of its foundation, obtaining 11.04% of the votes, three senators and eleven representatives. It is led by Guido Manini Ríos, descendant of a traditional Colorado Party family and former Commander in Chief of the Army.

According to "Cifra", a consultancy firm, in October 2019, 24% of its voters were previously from the Broad Front, 14% from the Colorado Party and 10% from the National Party. Gonzalo Ferreira Sienra, one of the children of Wilson Ferreira Aldunate, is a member of Cabildo Abierto.

History 
This political group applied to the Electoral Court in early 2019 to request its registration as a party, to compete in the presidential primaries of that year. The request was approved on March 10, after the acceptance of some 3,000 signatures submitted by citizens. The current name refers to the old town hall meetings of the colonial era, which in modern usage has been transferred to holding open meetings in order to make decisions.

It is chaired by lawyer and notary Guillermo Domenech, a former member of the National Party who served as a Notary of the  President's Office from 1990 to 2019. Manini Ríos's wife, Irene Moreira, who also belonged to the National Party, resigned from it and joined Cabildo Abierto.

Ideology 
Cabildo Abierto has shown an emphasis on economic interventionism, nationalism, public security and social conservatism. This sets them apart from traditional Uruguayan parties of the centre and right like the Colorado and National parties, more involved in economic liberalism. Their presidential candidate was Guido Manini Ríos, an army general under President Tabaré Vázquez that opposed left-wing judicial activism aimed at prosecuting members of the armed forces on human rights charges.

Progressive international news outlets such as El País from Madrid analyse this phenomenon as a sign of the rise of the populist right in the mold of Donald Trump and Brexit in a traditionally centrist country. Polling analysis does not bear this out, however, and many followers are simply disenchanted with the country's social and economic drift under previous administrations.

2019 election 

In the June 2019 presidential primaries, Cabildo Abierto had had more than 40,000 votes across the country, making it the fourth Uruguayan political force. The departments with the most votes for this party were Rivera, Cerro Largo and Artigas.

In mid-August, Manini Ríos confirmed the party's president, Guillermo Domenech, as his running mate for the general election.

In the general election, Open Cabildo obtained 268,736 votes (11.46%) and won three seats in the Senate and 11 in the Chamber of Representatives. In the face of the second round (ballotage), Open Cabildo was part of the Coalición Multicolor, which supported Luis Lacalle Pou and which was also composed of the National Party (PN), Colorado Party (PN), Independent Party (PI) and the Party of the People (PG).

Electoral history

Presidential elections

Chamber of Deputies and Senate elections

References

External links 
 Official web site

 
2019 establishments in Uruguay
Conservative parties in Uruguay

Political parties established in 2019
Political parties in Uruguay
Right-wing populism in South America
Right-wing populist parties
Social conservative parties